Sophie Seipt, also seen as Sophie Seibt (1812-1889), was a German composer and arranger who wrote several pieces for cello and piano.

Seipt was born in Cologne. Little is known about her education. Her music has been recorded commercially by Kaleidos and published by Oliver Ditson and Theodore Presser Company. Her works include:

Chamber 

Drie Romanzen, opus 1 (cello and piano)
Fantasie (cello and piano)
other pieces for cello and piano

Vocal 

“Ever Faithful” (by Johann Sebastian Bach; arranged by Sophie Seibt)
Sechs vierstimmige Lieder, opus 2 (for soprano, alto, tenor and bass)
no. 1 “Glockentone” (text by Franz Otto)
no. 2 “Die Nacht” (text by Nikolaus Lenau)
no. 3 “Laut jubelnd durcheilte der Fruhling die Au”
no. 4 “Die Sennin” (text by Nikolaus Lenau)
no. 5 “Auf eines Berges Hohen” (text by Wolfgang Muller von Konigswinter)
no. 6 “Du bist wie eine Blume” (text by Heinrich Heine)

See also 

Download Sophie Seibt’s arrangement of My Heart Ever Faithful by Johann Sebastian Bach

References 

German women composers
1812 births
1889 deaths
Composers for cello
People from Cologne